On 29 February 2012, the Bahraini and Indonesian national association football teams faced each other in a qualifying match for the 2014 FIFA World Cup. The match was played at the Bahrain National Stadium in Riffa, Bahrain. It was the biggest win for Bahrain, and the biggest defeat for Indonesia. This match is known for the investigation called for by FIFA afterwards.

Before this match Bahrain needed to score nine goals and Qatar lose their next match against Iran in order to pass Qatar and move on to the next round in qualifying but due to an 83rd-minute equalizer the game finished 2–2 and thus Qatar progressed instead of Bahrain.

Background 
Prior to the final matchday the table was:

Before the game, Bahrain required a winning margin of nine goals to stand any chance of progressing to the next stage.

Leading up to the game, Indonesia had lost all five matches to date in their qualification group, allowing 16 goals in the process. Internal conflict in the Football Association of Indonesia led them to prevent all Indonesia Super League players from playing. They only sent players who play in the Indonesian Premier League, although Indonesia's regular, better, and more experienced national players play in the Indonesia Super League. Indonesia was understood to have fielded inexperienced players due to this situation.

Prior to this match, Indonesia's record loss was 9–0, recorded in 1974 at the hands of Denmark.

In the six previous meetings between the two teams, each team had won twice, with two matches having been drawn. Both teams had met earlier in this round at the Gelora Bung Karno Stadium in Jakarta, with Bahrain winning 2–0. Prior to the qualification process, both teams last met at the same venue during the 2007 AFC Asian Cup group stage match on 10 July 2007. Hosts Indonesia won 2–1, avenging the 3–1 defeat at the same stage nearly three years earlier.

Match summary
Indonesia started the game with an inexperienced side, with no player holding more than 12 international caps. This was also the international debut for eight players in the Indonesia starting line up (except Syamsidar, Irfan Bachdim, and Ferdinand Sinaga).

Indonesia suffered an early setback when their goalkeeper Syamsidar was shown the red card in the first three minutes. After Bahrain scored the resultant penalty, they went on to be awarded a total of four penalties in the match, including three in the first half, although substitute Indonesia goalkeeper Andi Muhammad Guntur managed to save two of the four kicks.

Match details

Post match
The final table was as follows:

Following the match, Indonesia finished the third round with the worst overall record of the 20 competing teams, having scored no points at all in the round while conceding a total of 26 goals.

Bahrain also failed to qualify for the next stage of qualifying, finishing with two wins, three draws and a single loss.

References

External links
 Official match report at FIFA.com

2012 in Asian football
FIFA World Cup qualification matches
2014 FIFA World Cup qualification (AFC)
Bahrain national football team matches
Indonesia national football team matches
2011–12 in Bahraini football
2011–12 in Indonesian football
FIFA World Cup controversies
February 2012 sports events in Asia